George Pirie may refer to:
 George Pirie (publisher) (1799–1870), Canadian newspaper publisher
 Sir George Pirie (artist) (1863–1946), Scottish artist
 George Alexander Pirie (1864–1929), Scottish radiologist
 Sir George Pirie (RAF officer) (1896–1980), British air marshal
 George Pirie (politician), Canadian politician, elected to the Legislative Assembly of Ontario in 2022